The Townley Vase is a large Roman marble vase of the 2nd century CE, discovered in 1773 by the Scottish antiquarian and dealer in antiquities Gavin Hamilton in excavating a Roman villa at Monte Cagnolo, between Genzano and Civita Lavinia, near the ancient Lanuvium, in Lazio, southeast of Rome. The ovoid vase has volute handles in the manner of a pottery krater. It is carved with a deep frieze in bas-relief, occupying most of the body, illustrating a Bacchanalian procession. Its name comes from the English collector Charles Townley, who purchased it from Hamilton in 1774 for £250. Townley's collection, long on display in his London house in Park Street,  was bought for the British Museum after his death in 1805.

In the 19th century it was often imagined that Keats' Ode on a Grecian Urn (1819) was inspired by the Townley Vase, though modern critics suggest instead that the inspiration was more generic, and may have also owed something to scenes portrayed on William Hamilton's collection of Greek vases which entered the BM collection at around the same time.

Copies of the Townley Vase were made in plaster and imitation marble throughout the 19th century. At the turn of the 20th century terracotta versions were made by Manifattura di Signa in Italy. Between the World Wars, table lamps modelled after the Townley Vase identified "cultured" households.

Notes

See also 

 Townley Venus

References 

 Cook, Brian F. 1986. The Townley Marbles (London, The British Museum Press), pp 18–19, fig. 15.

External links
British Museum: Townley Vase

Vase
Hellenistic and Roman sculptural vases
Hellenistic-style Roman sculptures
Archaeological discoveries in Italy
1773 archaeological discoveries